2-Aminoacridine is an aminoacridine.

See also

 3-Aminoacridine
 4-Aminoacridine
 9-Aminoacridine

Aromatic amines
Acridines